Monika Aidelsburger (born 1987) is a German quantum physicist, Professor and Group Leader at the Ludwig Maximilian University of Munich. Her research considers quantum simulation and ultra cold atomic gases trapped in optical lattices. In 2021, she was awarded both the Alfried-Krupp-Förderpreis and Klung Wilhelmy Science Award.

Early life and education 
Born in Aichach, Aidelsburger was a doctoral student at the Ludwig Maximilian University of Munich, where she worked under the supervision of Immanuel Bloch. Her work considered ultra cold atoms in optical lattices.

She was a postdoctoral researcher at the Collège de France, where she worked alongside Jean Dalibard on uniform Bose gas. Her doctorate was later published by Springer Nature as part of their Outstanding PhD thesis series.

Research and career 
In 2017 Aidelsburger joined the faculty at the Ludwig Maximilian University of Munich, where she was promoted to Professor in 2019. She holds a joint position at the Max Planck Institute of Quantum Optics. Here she successfully applied for a European Research Council Starting Grant on synthetic quantum matter.

Her research considers lattice gauge theories and how they couple to fermionic matter. She performs quantum simulations of many-body physics. These simulations can achieve with a high degree of control and can achieve complex physical behaviour, including many-body localization and Hilbert space fragmentation. They can be engineered to investigate out-of-equilibrium phases and topological lattice models, including the Haldane model and Hofstadter's butterfly. Her experiments typically contain a laser cooling stage, where atoms are cooled to very low temperatures (generating either Bose–Einstein condensates or degenerate Fermi gases), which she traps into optical potentials that are generated by interfering laser beams.

The Swiss National Science Foundation nominated Aidelsburger to AcademiaNet in 2021. That year, she was awarded both the Alfried-Krupp-Förderpreis, named after Alfried Krupp von Bohlen und Halbach, and Klung Wilhelmy Science Award in 2021.

Awards and recognitions 

 2016 Marie Curie Fellowship
 2019 Prinzessin Therese von Bayern Award
 2021 
 2021 Klung Wilhelmy Science Award

Selected publications

References 

Quantum physicists
Academic staff of the Ludwig Maximilian University of Munich
Ludwig Maximilian University of Munich alumni
Living people
1987 births